is a fictional character introduced in the 2010 visual novel Danganronpa: Trigger Happy Havoc by Spike Chunsoft. A world-successful romance novelist, Toko is chosen to enroll into Hope's Peak Academy as the "Ultimate Prodigy". However, when Toko arrives at the Academy, a sadistic, remote-controlled stuffed bear named Monokuma appears before her and her fellow students, telling them they will be imprisoned in the academy for the rest of their lives unless they murder somebody. Toko and Jack/Jill return in various Danganronpa spin-off media as well as in multiple adaptations featuring them in new story arcs as antiheroes.

Writer Kazutaka Kodaka created Toko to most represent the games' worldview, being the only playable character in the series to be featured as a main character in more than one game. Miyuki Sawashiro voices her in Japanese while Amanda Céline Miller and Erin Fitzgerald respectively provide Toko's and Jill's voices for the English dub of the game. Carli Mosier provides her voice in the anime adaptation's English dub.

Critical response to Toko's and Jill's characters has been generally positive for their constantly evolving role in the series, as well as the deliveries from her voice actors. Their roles in the spin-off Danganronpa Another Episode: Ultra Despair Girls and anime sequel Danganronpa 3: The End of Hope's Peak High School was also the subject of attraction due to how her dissociative identity disorder is discussed, and her relationship with Komaru Naegi.

Creation and development

In developing Toko's characterization, writer/scenario creator Kazutaka Kodaka from Spike Chunsoft considered "[t]he easy thing [to] have been to make her the final boss, the last enemy, the culprit. But my goal in this series is to play to people's expectations, so I said, "No, no, no. Let's turn this around. Let's move to the next level with the personalities and let's go for it." Ultimately, despite the talent of "Ultimate Murderous Fiend", Toko does not kill any characters in the first game, and the game's mastermind is presented as deceased "Ultimate Fashionista" Junko Enoshima. In a subsequent interview with Siliconera, Kodaka stated:

"[Toko Fukawa] is an excellent representation of the series. When I was writing the first game and figuring out what was going to happen to Junko, I started to write Genocide Jack and how different that character was from Toko. While I was writing this I felt this is the kind of tension and tempo I want the series to carry. At the end of the day, I felt Toko represented what Danganronpa was and the kind of storytelling might have." — Kazutaka Kodaka

The character's design was created by lead artist Rui Komatsuzaki, who considers Toko Fukawa and Genocide Jack/Jill his favorite characters, "a unique character all by herself, but with Genocide Jack included we managed to make her ten times more so." Originally designed as a potential mastermind inspired by the character of Alyssa Hale / Mr. Bates from the 1998 video game Clock Tower II: The Struggle Within, Genocide Jack/Jill was designed with the most facial expressions in the first game, having a separate sprite file from her Toko form. This initially proved difficult in order to make a contrast between the personality of Genocide Jack/Jill and the more plain design of Toko, with Komatsuzaki having "thought it would be incredibly tough to make such a severe personality change using the same character design, so my original plan was to base Genocide Jack on Toko's design but change it considerably. I fell back to the current transformation after being told having them look too different would be messy since she transforms back and forth so often." Elements of the original character designs were additionally incorporated into those of Junko Enoshima, Peko Pekoyama, and Tsumugi Shirogane. Toko's English voice actresses were cited as the most challenging to find due to the portrayal of her psychopathic personality Genocide Jill/Jack; ultimately, voice actresses Amanda Céline Miller and Erin Fitzgerald (who also voiced Junko Enoshima) were chosen to voice the characters.

Appearances

Danganronpa video games
After the beginning of the killing game, Toko starts to fall in love with Ultimate Affluent Progeny Byakuya Togami, who remains indifferent towards her, always staying by Byakuya's side. In the last trial, Jill is revealed to have retained her memories of the two years the students previously spent at Hope's Peak Academy, confirming the mastermind's account of the outside world being a post-apocalyptic dystopia, the pair ultimately surviving and escaping with the other remaining students. In an alternate ending to Trigger Happy Havoc in which Kyoko Kirigiri is executed after being blamed for killing Mukuro Ikusaba, Toko has a son with Byakuya before eventually dying after establishing a polyamorous relationship with her fellow students. While not appearing in Danganronpa 2: Goodbye Despair, Toko is alluded to when Kyoko mentions to Byakuya that "someone" is waiting for him to return from Jabberwock Island, to which Byakuya responds by asking her not to remind him of "something so horrifying", implying he has in part agreed to some of Toko's intentions towards him.

During the events of Danganronpa Another Episode: Ultra Despair Girls, set between the events of the first two games, Toko is revealed to have joined the Future Foundation alongside Byakuya, albeit on the level of intern until she can fully control the actions of Genocide Jill with her stun gun, in addition to having taken a vow not to kill any more people in exchange for membership. After Byakuya is kidnapped by the Servant in Towa City, Toko and Jill seek out Komaru Naegi, the younger sister of Makoto Naegi, in order to escort her through the city and the traps of the Warriors of Hope, assisting her in destroying the group's various Monokuma robots. After defeating the Warriors of Hope and their leader Monaca Towa, Toko and Jill take on the Resistance-created "Big Bang Monokuma" alongside Komaru, before freeing Byakuya from captivity, who once again rejects Toko romantically after she openly fantasizes about him. Toko and Jill then decide to remain behind in Towa City with Komaru, both in order to cover for Byakuya's escape for the Future Foundation, to help Komaru find her deceased parents' bodies, and to hunt down Monaca and the Servant.

Toko appears in a cameo appearance in the third main series installment, Danganronpa V3: Killing Harmony, in the bonus minigame "Ultimate Talent Development Plan", with her appearance being briefly adopted by the "Ultimate Cosplayer" Tsumugi Shirogane in the main storyline, and Jill being additionally referenced via a mention of her "Ultimate Murderous Fiend" talent.

Comparing Toko's looks in her first two games, her hair is loosened in Ultra Despair Girls while it is twintail braided in Happy Trigger Havoc. Her school uniform is intact at first, but is later worn out.

Danganronpa anime
Toko returns in the episode "Ultra Despair Girls" of Danganronpa 3: The End of Hope's Peak High School, where the pair confront Monaca once again in Towa City over suspicion of her potential involvement in the new Monokuma's "Monokuma Hunter" game. Upon learning that Monaca is not the new mastermind, Toko reports this information to Byakuya; she is later seen watching the brainwashing video of the true "Mastermind of Hope", Ryota Mitarai. Years later, Toko assists Aoi Asahina in moving boxes at a newly reopened Hope's Peak Academy, accepting an offer for a drink from Komaru.

Danganrona novels
Toko makes minor cameo appearances in the light novel series Danganronpa Kirigiri and the manga series Killer Killer. In the light novel trilogy Danganronpa Togami, set before and during the events of "The Tragedy", prior to the events of Danganronpa: Trigger Happy Havoc, Toko is depicted in the first volume in the company of Junko Enoshima, assisting her in converting Hope's Peak Academy into a fallout shelter, expressing jealousy at Byakuya's relationship with Junko while attempting to flirt with him over a video call. After being informed by Byakuya's secretary Blue Ink of his capture over a later call, Toko charters a private plane to Prague so she may rescue him. However, upon arriving in the third volume and finding Byakuya to have been freed, and have taken up his Imposter's position of taking advantage of the Tragedy to actually conquer the world, Toko takes up a position as his personal bodyguard, unleashing Genocide Jill against the forces of the World Health Organization (WHO) and Byakuya's half-brothers Suzuhiko Ootsuki and Kazuya, criticizing the latter's custom copyright-infringing lightsaber before quietly walking away after a third party kills the former. The following weekend, while preparing Hope's Peak Academy for a potentially permanent state of lockdown with a sprained wrist, Toko accepts help from Byakuya in moving a heavy cardboard box, offering to throw him a surprise party while discussing the paradox of what the box might contain, and asking whether he could one day consider allowing her to bear his child.

Other appearances
Toko Fukawa and Genocide Jack/Jill appear in the Japanese manga adaptation of the series, written and illustrated by Touya Hajime and published by Enterbrain, as well as the adaptation of Danganronpa Another Episode: Ultra Despair Girls, subtitled Genocider Mode, which is told solely from her perspective. The series was published in the United States by Enterbrain USA. An additional manga series, published by Ichijinsha, was released solely in Japan. A Japanese musical and series of stage plays based on the series, sponsored by Kellogg's Cornflakes, cast actresses Hikaru Ohsawa and Kanon Nanaki as Toko Fukawa and Genocide Jack/Jill, adapting the events of the first game, Ultra Despair Girls, and the anime series.

Toko Fukawa and Genocide Jack/Jill are included as playable characters in a 2014 crossover event of the Sega horror game, Chain Chronicle, alongside fellow Danganronpa Another Episode: Ultra Despair Girls protagonist Komaru Naegi and damsel-in-distress Byakuya Togami, where their storylines in the event depict the group as they seek to return home to their original universe. In the Japacos Cosplay Studio fan film Last Love Letter, Toko Fukawa and Genocide Jack/Jill are physically portrayed by C.N. Nami and voiced by Sarannooch Puengheng.

Clothing
In December 2020, Japanese fashion brand Estryllia Enhillia announced a clothing line featuring a range of dresses, accessories, and unisex clothing pieces themed around Danganronpa characters to tie in with the 10th anniversary of Danganronpa: Trigger Happy Havoc, including Toko, Byakuya Togami, Makoto Naegi, Kyoko Kirigiri, Junko Enoshima and Monokuma.

Reception

Critical response to the character has been favorable. GameSpot praised Toko in Ultra Despair Girls as "contrasting well as a co-star to Komaru with her weird brand of aloofness––[especially for] a character I had not pegged as one who could carry a spin-off when I first finished the original game," praising the writers for "having done a fantastic job making her shine [compared to the] bitter, anti-social authoress Toko from the original Danganronpa: [Trigger Happy Havoc]. God Is A Geek praised the depiction of the "strong bond" in the relationship between Toko and fellow Ultra Despair Girls protagonist Komaru Naegi. US Gamer expressed dislike for Toko's characterization in the first game, more favorably praising her "darker" depiction in Ultra Despair Girls as "proving great writing can sometimes save a shallow experience.",<ref>{{cite web|url=https://www.usgamer.net/articles/a-return-to-danganronpas-world-makes-ultra-despair-girls-worthwhile|last=Mackey|first=Bob|title=A Return to Danganronpa'''s World Makes Ultra Despair Girls Worthwhile|date=2 September 2015|work=USgamer.net|access-date=2015-09-02|archive-url=https://web.archive.org/web/20150905062836/https://www.usgamer.net/articles/a-return-to-danganronpas-world-makes-ultra-despair-girls-worthwhile|archive-date=2015-09-09|url-status=live}}</ref> while Anime News Network praised the character's "strong" voice dub.Koi-Nya praised Kodaka's rendition of Toko in Ultra Despair Girls as "a character for the first title and [how] when they could have left her there, in a position of greater power but without any development, like Byakuya or the protagonist of the first game [in Goodbye Despair], they use her masterfully in the psychological development of the protagonist of Another Episode [Komaru Naegi], "the two [being] tools in the plot while Toko is an entity with a life of her own that could not exist in this story without Komaru and vice versa, while Hardcore Gamer complimented Toko for her "murderous glory [as] one of the quirkiest characters from the original title", and Genocide Jill's "eccentric role." The Gamer listed her as the second-best classmate character in the Danganronpa series behind Kyoko Kirigiri based on her evolution from a shy nervous writer to one able to control her serial killer aspects of her self. Kotaku acclaimed Toko in Ultra Despair Girls'' as a "memorable character [who] lends a hint of the unhinged to proceedings" throughout the series, while Comic Book Resources ranked her as the 4th creepiest "yandere girlfriend" character in manga and anime in 2019.

References

Danganronpa characters
Female characters in anime and manga
Female characters in video games
Fictional bodyguards in video games
Fictional characters with alter egos
Fictional characters with amnesia
Fictional characters with dissociative identity disorder
Fictional Japanese people in video games
Fictional private investigators
Fictional secret agents and spies
Fictional serial killers
Fictional writers
Video game characters introduced in 2010